Operation Jericho (Ramrod 564) took place on 18 February 1944 during the Second World War. Allied aircraft bombed Amiens Prison in German-occupied France at very low altitude to blow holes in the prison walls, kill German guards and use shock waves to spring open cell doors. The French Resistance was waiting on the outside to rescue prisoners and spirit them away.

Mosquito fighter-bombers breached the walls, prison buildings and destroyed the guards' barracks. Of the 832 prisoners, 102 were killed by the bombing, 74 were wounded and 258 escaped, including 79 Resistance members and political prisoners; two-thirds of the escapees were recaptured.

Two Mosquitos and a Typhoon fighter escort were shot down and another Typhoon was lost at sea. The raid is notable for the precision and daring of the attack, which was filmed by a camera on one of the Mosquitos. There is debate as to who requested the attack and whether it was necessary.

Background

French resistance

The Germans wanted to keep preparations for the Allied invasion and the V-1 flying bomb reprisal offensive as secret as possible. Lucien Pieri, a shopkeeper in Amiens, had run a profitable sideline as a  informer since 1941 and by 1943 had a network of informers which penetrated many of the resistance networks in northern France.

Prisoners of the  winter offensive of 1943–1944, taken around Amiens were imprisoned at the local prison where, in December 1943, twelve  were shot. Earlier in the war, Vivant had established an information-gathering system in which people gleaned information on the defences of the Channel coast and passed it to village mayors, who delivered it to Vivant for onward transmission to London by wireless. With the loss of so many resistance leaders, Vivant had come to know far too much about the invasion and how the resistance was expected to support it, which included a plan to reorganise the resistance and to expand it tenfold. The loss of Vivant brought OCM and other networks to the brink of collapse.

News that Raymond Vivant had been captured was smuggled out of Amiens prison and transmitted to England. The US Office of Strategic Services (OSS) and the Secret Intelligence Service (MI6) feared the Germans might uncover his identity and extract information from him; the damage to Allied plans would be incalculable. News also arrived that two American spies and a British agent were in Amiens prison, two of them apparently recent arrivals in France. A request for a rescue attempt was made by William J. Donovan, the head of OSS to Stewart Menzies, the head of MI6, which was passed on to the War Cabinet. The Gaullist  (BCRA) in London was asked for all its information on Amiens prison and the escape and evasion specialists of MI9 and MISX, the US equivalent, began collecting information for a breakout attempt. At all costs, London and Washington wanted Raymond Vivant freed or killed in the attempt.

Amiens prison
Maurice Holville obtained a permit to deliver parcels to the prison, to draw sketches of the interior layout of the prison and to study the rhythms and routines of guards, to go with the blueprints stolen from the town archives. Another member of the resistance studied the outer walls while seemingly kissing his girlfriend but the resistance failed to discover the true thickness of the outer wall or that its stone blocks were not mortared. The information revealed by the espionage was recorded and the papers were cut in two. One set of halves was retained by a senior member of the Sosie group. and the other halves were given to "Serge" to deliver onwards. An armed raid was feasible, as had been attempted at St Quentin prison recently, although this had been bloodily repulsed and security increased in other prisons.

Intelligence reports put the German guards' quarters on the short sides of the cruciform, drawn in a sketch received from the Resistance. The guards' mess was in the quarters at one end and the guard room in the other. The guards had lunch at noon and many of the prisoners had their midday meal at the same time in the central hall of the prison. Building B in the photographs appeared to be a small estate of semi-detached two-storey houses with gabled roofs, thought to be private dwellings; building C was marked as Hospice St Victor. The attackers would have to breach the prison walls and hit each end of the main building to blow open the gable ends. The shock of the explosions should spring open cell doors without destroying the building and massacring the prisoners.

A rescue attempt of some nature was considered essential to reassure the resistance prisoners that they had not been abandoned, to reinforce the survivors of the recent round-ups with escapees and to recruit ordinary criminal prisoners. The mother of two resistance prisoners got herself arrested and was able to pass on instructions for prisoners to lie down if aircraft appeared overhead and be ready for a breakout attempt. Normal prisoners were held in the criminal sections, in such overcrowded conditions that in some cells, eight prisoners at a time lay down to sleep and the rest stood until it was their turn. The Germans put some of the "politicals" in with the normal criminals because of the lack of room and some criminals were really "politicals" arrested for criminal offences who had remained incognito. Three British, an American and a Belgian agent were held in solitary, with three Americans captured in civilian clothes, who had claimed to be shot-down aircrew and been imprisoned as suspected agents, rather than prisoners of war. On 19 February, 26 men and three women imprisoned with the criminals and several inmates from the German section were due to be shot by firing squad on the orders of the Amiens Tribunal.

Prelude

Ground plan

At noon for the week before the raid, the Resistance had about 100 confederates outside the prison and about 16 prisoners in the know, ready for an escape attempt; twelve look-outs were placed in houses near the prison and several fluent German speakers were dressed in SS uniforms with markings recognisable to Resistance personnel. Leading up to the midday deadline, ten gazogene lorries and several cars happened to be in the area, some parked and others passing through; bicycles and velocycles were stashed in houses and shops. The Resistance had several teams hidden nearby armed with Sten submachine-guns, pistols and hand grenades, ready to rush through the prison walls as inmates ran out.

Arms and ammunition had been parachuted to the Resistance to arm escapers. Male and female clothing was collected and an interpreter purloined blank ID cards, passes and official stamps. The Resistance fabricated false identities for escapers; safe houses were prepared in Amiens and far beyond in towns like Arras and Abbeville. A French prison warder sympathetic to the Resistance agreed to sound out other warders and a criminal prisoner had drawn a picture of a master key, made a copy and arranged with a guard to try it out, covered in candle black, for minor adjustments, then made duplicated. As a precaution, the prisoner was also asked to break into the administration offices before escaping to destroy the prisoners' records.

Air plan

Operation Jericho (Ramrod 564), was allocated to 140 Wing, RAF 2nd Tactical Air Force. Eighteen de Havilland Mosquito FB Mk VIs, six from No. 487 Squadron RNZAF (Wing Commander Irving "Black" Smith), six of No. 464 Squadron RAAF (Wing Commander Bob Iredale), both being Article XV squadrons. Six Mosquitos of 21 Squadron (Wing Commander Ivor G. E. "Daddy" Dale) were to follow up in case the raid failed and bomb the prison, killing the prisoners. A photographic reconnaissance (PR) Mosquito was laid on for the Royal Air Force Film Production Unit (FPU), to film the raid. The raid was provisionally set for 17 February; the Mosquitos were to arrive over the prison at noon sharp, to catch the guards at lunch for the second wave to bomb them. The plan was divulged to the Resistance for them to tip off the underground in the prison and to arrange for accomplices to be waiting outside.

Air Vice-Marshal Basil Embry, the officer commanding 2 Group, intended to lead the raid but was overruled and forced to stand down because he was involved in the planning of the Invasion of Normandy. Group Captain Charles Pickard, the CO of No. 140 Wing assumed command of the mission. Each Mosquito squadron was to have an escort of one Hawker Typhoon squadron, 174 Squadron and 245 Squadron from RAF Westhampnett and a squadron provided by Air Defence of Great Britain (the part of Fighter command not transferred to the 2nd Tactical Air Force) from RAF Manston. A plaster of paris model of the prison was built, based on photographs and other details sent from France, a common practice in RAF planning. Bomb load for the Mosquitos was two  Semi-armour piercing (SAP) bombs for the outer walls and two  Medium Capacity (MC) for the inner walls, all fuzed for 11 seconds' delay. The first section of three aircraft from 487 Squadron were to attack the eastern wall at 12:00 at low altitude, using the main road as a guide onto the target, the second three to make a north–south attack on the northern wall once the first bombs had exploded. The first section of 464 Squadron RAAF would attack the south–eastern end of the main building three minutes later and the second section would attack the north–western end.

The two sections of 21 Squadron, in reserve, were ordered to attack the prison ten minutes later, one from the east and one from the north, if the attack had failed to bomb the prison and kill the occupants; if not needed, Pickard would transmit "Red, Daddy, Red" for the 21 Squadron Mosquitos to bring their bombs home. The weather worsened after 10 February, with low cloud and snow across Europe; Hunsdon was covered by deep snow, under thick cloud and blizzards. On 16 February stringent security precautions were imposed and the camp was sealed. Security operatives were based in the camp and others mingled with the public in pubs and cafés, eavesdropped on telephone calls and censored the post. A navigator, somewhat unwisely, called his girlfriend and mentioned "special circumstances", which led to all the aircrew being berated by Pickard for complacency. Thick cloud and blizzards persisted on 17 February and forced a postponement; revised weather forecasts usually arrived in the afternoon; apart from a risk of icing, these suggested that the weather over France might have improved by the next day.

Briefing

On 18 February, the nineteen picked crews awoke to find RAF Hunsdon still covered with snow under low cloud and blizzards but it was impossible to wait any longer. A more favourable weather forecast led to a decision to risk the operation and the 18 Mosquito bombers and the PR Mosquito "O-Orange" were prepared. The aircrews were woken at 06:00 to the sound of Merlin engines being tested; briefing was at 08:00 and each man was subjected to an identity check as he entered the briefing room. A large box on a table contained a model of the target. Pickard, Embry and the wing navigation officer, Edward (Ted) Sismore entered the room. Pickard spoke first, explaining the unusual nature of Ramrod 564.

The crews took their time to study the route and the model of the prison; by mid-morning the preparations were complete and the Mosquitos were lined up in their take-off order; few of the crews had flown before in such weather. Pickard, in "F-Freddie", was to bring up the rear of the second wave to assess the damage and to call on 21 Squadron if need be. If Pickard was unable to send the signal ("Red, Daddy, Red Daddy") the crew of "O-Orange", the FPU Mosquito, would broadcast it instead. Rendezvous with the Typhoons was at Littlehampton. The two Typhoon squadrons at RAF Westhampnett were briefed in a rush at 10:55 and began their take-offs at 11:10 without long-range tanks. At RAF Manston, the weather was so bad that the ADGB station commander refused to allow take-offs. Several 198 Squadron Typhoons were sent instead but did not reach Amiens until all but the FPU Mosquito had left for home.

Attack

The Mosquitos took off in turn, disappearing into mist and driving snow, Smith leading the way with the six 487 Squadron Mosquitos.

The weather over RAF Westhampnett was slightly better than at Manston and eight Typhoons of 174 Squadron took off, followed by eight from 245 Squadron. The rendezvous at Littlehampton failed in the severe weather but over the Channel, 174 Squadron met four Mosquitos of the second wave, which were joined by another four half way across the Channel. The Typhoons of 245 Squadron found another three Mosquitos, the last of the third wave, two Mosquitoes each from 464 and 21 squadrons having flown into snow clouds and returned to base.

Flight Lieutenant Hanafin in EG-Q suffered an engine fire on the way to the target and feathered the propeller which put the fire out. Hanafin managed to keep up with the formation for some time but eventually dropped back and restarted the faulty engine to catch up. The engine caught fire again and Hanafin had to jettison his bombs and turn back about  short of the prison. EG-Q was hit twice by  wounding Hanafin in the neck and paralysing his right side; he was in such pain that the navigator gave him a morphine injection. Hanafin flew back through the snowstorm and managed to land EG-Q at an airfield in Sussex. The remaining Mosquitos flew on and saw Fw 190s taxiing at Glisy airfield, not far from Amiens.

Fw 190s hid in the cloud, dived on the attackers and zoomed back into the cloud.

At 12:01 the Mosquitos reached the target, three of the 487 Squadron aircraft aiming at the eastern and northern walls of the prison. The 464 Squadron Mosquitos were too close behind and had to circle while the first bombs detonated in the outer walls. A hit on the guardhouse killed or disabled the occupants and a number of prisoners were killed or wounded, while many were able to escape. As the Mosquitos turned for home, Fw 190s of 7./Jagdgeschwader 26 (JG 26) attacked them and were engaged by the Typhoon escorts.

Renaud thought that he had been hit by German anti-aircraft guns but  Waldemar Radener, the pilot of an Fw 190, had managed to get behind Renaud and shoot him down, his twelfth victory. Squadron Leader A. I. McRitchie, the pilot of Mosquito SB-T, was hit by  near Albert and crash-landed; McRitchie was injured in the crash and found that the navigator, Flight Lieutenant R. W. Sampson, was dead. Close to Amiens, Mosquito EG-T of 487 Squadron was hit by  wounding the pilot, Flying Officer M. N. Sparks, and damaging the port engine; Sparks feathered the propeller and managed to reach England, landing on one engine at RAF Ford.

About ten minutes later, Mayer damaged a 487 Squadron Mosquito, claiming a probable. As the FPU Mosquito made three photographic runs over the prison before turning for England, the two 174 Squadron Typhoon escorts kept watch. On the return journey, Flying Officer "Junior" Markby, in Typhoon XP-A, on the starboard side of the Mosquito, came in for a close-up. Markby said afterwards that he was relieved that the Mosquito was better equipped to navigate through the bad weather as the two Typhoons were running low on fuel.

21 February
On 21 February, four Typhoons of 247 Squadron covered two PR Mosquitos sent to photograph the prison. The aircraft were met by intense  as they crossed the coast, the worst yet encountered by 247 Squadron. Flight Lieutenant C. E. Brayshaw, the commander of A flight was hit and turned back with a damaged engine but parts of the empennage (tail) detached and the Typhoon dived from  into the sea off Cabourg, killing him; two Typhoons were damaged and one pilot wounded.

Aftermath

Of the 832 prisoners at the gaol, 255 men escaped, including half of those due to be shot; many escapees were shot by guards as they ran from the prison and 182 were recaptured soon afterwards. Resistance prisoners who made good their escapes were later able to expose over sixty Gestapo agents and informers, severely affecting the German counter-intelligence effort. Ordinary prisoners, not recaptured or giving themselves up, were informally amnestied by the French police and left alone. Pickard and Broadley were reported missing and everyone at RAF Hunsdon was told to keep quiet in case they had survived "but it was not long before we heard news that he [Pickard] was dead" (Flight Lieutenant Les Bulmer, 21 Squadron). It was not until September 1944 that it was announced formally that Pickard and Broadley had been killed in action. In March 1944, Ponchardier signalled,

Controversy
The circumstances involving the request and the true purpose of the mission are still secret. While it has been purported that the request came from the French Resistance, which had members in the prison scheduled to be executed, a post-war investigation by the RAF revealed that Resistance leaders were not aware of the raid until the RAF requested a description of the prison. The bombing enabled 258 prisoners to escape; several German guards were killed along with 102 prisoners, and many escapees were later recaptured. A (Most Secret) letter of March 1944 for Menzies, thanked the RAF for the raid. When the head of the SOE French section, Maurice Buckmaster, was confronted with the letter, signed by "C", he stated that he had never seen it and that he had not requested the raid and did not know who had. A 2011 BBC television documentary on Operation Jericho speculated the raid may have been intended to divert the attention of German military intelligence from Normandy, where the Allied invasion of France took place on 6 June.

Memorials
A plaque at the prison is dedicated to those who died in the attack and a general airfield memorial is at Hunsdon Airfield, the Mosquito base. On the 60th anniversary in 2004, a Spitfire performed a flypast, as none of the surviving Mosquitos were airworthy.

Aircraft involved

de Havilland Mosquito

Details from Fishman (1983) unless specified.

Hawker Typhoon

See also
 Aarhus Air Raid, attack on Gestapo headquarters in Aarhus, Denmark
 Operation Carthage, attack on Gestapo headquarters in Copenhagen, Denmark
 Oslo Mosquito raid, attack on Gestapo headquarters in Oslo, Norway

Notes

Footnotes

References

Further reading

External links

 The Jail Breakers 1944 British Pathe
 Broadley, John Alan at CWGC
 Pickard, Percy Charles at CWGC
 RAF page on the attack

 IWM Interview with RAF pilot Duncan Taylor, who participated in the raid
 Article on Percy Pickard

Aerial operations and battles of World War II involving Germany
Aerial operations and battles of World War II involving the United Kingdom
World War II aerial operations and battles of the Western European Theatre
Amiens
POW escapes and rescues during World War II
History of Somme (department)
De Havilland Mosquito